Wensley is a small village and civil parish in the Richmondshire district of North Yorkshire, England. It consists of a few homes and holiday cottage, an inn, a pub and a historic church. The River Ure passes through the village.

The etymology of the name ultimately originates from a compound of an Old English form of the god Woden (attested Wednesleg  1212, earlier Wodnesleie, see Wednesday). Wensley gives its name to the dale Wensleydale.

For a century after its charter in 1202, Wensley had the only market in the dale and this continued into the 16th century. Plague struck Wensley in 1563, some surviving villagers fled to Leyburn, but the village recovered a century later when Charles Paulet built Bolton Hall in 1678 and became Duke of Bolton.

Wensley's Holy Trinity Church dates to 1300 and is a Grade I listed building. It is now redundant and cared for by the Churches Conservation Trust. It was featured as the wedding venue of James and Helen Herriot in the British television series All Creatures Great and Small, in the episode "The Last Furlong".

Wensley's railway station is now closed.

Ernie Gillatt, a footballer active in the 1920s, was born in Wensley.

References

External links

 

Villages in North Yorkshire
Civil parishes in North Yorkshire
Wensleydale